"Close Your Eyes" is a popular song, was written by British composers D. Carter and H. M. Tennent.

It was recorded by Jack Hylton and his orchestra, with a vocal by J. Pat O'Malley in 1931.

See also
 Close Your Eyes (1933 song)

1931 songs